Dean Richards may refer to:

 Dean Richards (rugby union) (born 1963), English rugby union player and coach
 Dean Richards (footballer) (1974–2011), English footballer
 Dean Richards (reporter) (born 1954), Chicago TV reporter